Aimée Duvivier (born 1766) was a French painter.

Duvivier was born either in Saint-Domingue or in Paris. Her father, Pierre-Charles Duvivier (1716–1780), was the director of the Savonnerie manufactory; her mother was Marie-Jeanne-Colombe Gromaire (died 1801). She was a pupil of Jean-Baptiste Greuze and exhibited at the Salon de la Jeunesse in 1786 and again in 1787. In 1791 she appeared at the Paris Salon, where her self-portrait attracted favorable notices. A few paintings have survived, but none of the work she is known to have produced in pastel is known to exist. Many details of Duvivier's biography remain obscure; even the year of her death is unclear, and has been given variously as 1824, 1834, and 1852.

Gallery

References

1766 births
Year of death uncertain
18th-century French painters
18th-century French women artists
French women painters